Frank Putnam may refer to:
 Frank Putnam (politician), Canadian politician, member of the Legislative Assembly of British Columbia
 Frank E. Putnam, American politician, member of the Minnesota Senate
 Frank W. Putnam, American biochemist